Gia proti fora (Greek: Για πρώτη φορά) is the name of a studio album by popular Greek singer Marinella. The album was entirely composed by Stefanos Korkolis, with lyrics by Anta Douka, Philippos Grapsas and Panos Falaras. It was released on 27 May 1997 in Greece and Cyprus by BMG Greece. This album was issued in mono and stereo. The stereo version of this album was released on CD at the same time.

Track listing 
Side One.
 "Afierono" (Αφιερώνω; I dedicate) – (Lyrics by Philippos Grapsas) – 4:32
 "Vasanismeni Kyriaki" (Βασανισμένη Κυριακή; Tormented Sunday) – (Lyrics by Anta Douka) – 4:26
 "Pes" (Πες; Say) – (Lyrics by Anta Douka) – 2:36
 "Gia proti fora" (Για πρώτη φορά; For the first time) in duet with Stefanos Korkolis  – (Lyrics by Anta Douka) – 4:33
 "Ela apopse san Vardaris" (Έλα απόψε σαν Βαρδάρης; Come tonight like Vardares wind) – (Lyrics by Panos Falaras) – 3:15
Side Two.
 "Doxa to Theo" (Δόξα τω Θεώ; Thank God) – (Lyrics by Philippos Grapsas) – 3:24
 "Methismeno karavi" (Μεθυσμένο καράβι; A drunken boat) – (Lyrics by Panos Falaras) – 2:59
 "San na 'tan chtes" (Σαν να 'ταν χθες; Like it was yesterday) – (Lyrics by Anta Douka) – 3:57
 "Opou ki an psaksis" (Όπου κι αν ψάξεις; Wherever you search) – (Lyrics by Anta Douka) – 4:30
 "Nichta sto Buenos Aires" (Νύχτα στο Μπουένος Άιρες; A night in Buenos Aires) – (Lyrics by Anta Douka) – 3:25

Music videos 
 "Vasanismeni Kyriaki" - Director: Manos Adamakis
 "Ela apopse san Vardaris" - Director: Kostas Kapetanidis

Personnel 
 Marinella - vocals, background vocals
 Stefanos Korkolis - vocals, arranger, conductor
 BMG Greece - producer
 Philippos Papatheodorou - art direction
 Yiannis Tountas - recording engineer
 Dinos Diamantopoulos - photographer
 Achilleas Haritos - make-up artist
 Konstantinos Savakis - hair stylist
 Thanos Spyropoulos - artwork

References

1997 albums
Greek-language albums
Marinella albums
Albums produced by Stefanos Korkolis
Sony Music Greece albums